Molly Weaver (born 15 March 1994) is a British racing cyclist, who currently rides for British amateur team Epic Cycles.

Career
At the 2015 British National Road Championships, Weaver finished second in the time trial, and fourth in the road race. In 2018 she competed for the British  team as their road captain.

See also
 List of 2015 UCI Women's Teams and riders

References

External links

1994 births
Living people
English female cyclists
Place of birth missing (living people)